The Robert Morris Colonials are the athletic teams for Robert Morris University, in Moon Township, Pennsylvania, a suburb of Pittsburgh. The Colonials compete in NCAA Division I (FCS, formerly Division I-AA, in football). In 2020, the school joined the Horizon League as a full member after leaving the Northeast Conference. Several RMU sports that are not sponsored by the Horizon League play in other conferences. Football plays in the Big South Conference, and men's and women's lacrosse respectively compete in the ASUN Conference and Mid-American Conference. The school colors are RMU Blue, RMU Red, and RMU Gray/Silver.

In December 2013, Robert Morris announced the school was cutting seven sports programs after the 2013–14 season: men's indoor and outdoor track, tennis and cross country and women's golf, tennis and field hockey.

Teams

Men's and women's basketball 

The men's team, which achieved NCAA Division I status starting with the 1976–77 season, has played in eight NCAA Tournaments:

 1982 Lost to Indiana (first round)
 1983 Lost to Purdue (first round)
 1989 Lost to Arizona (first round)
 1990 Lost to Kansas (first round)
 1992 Lost to UCLA (first round)
 2009 Lost to Michigan State (first round)
 2010 Lost to Villanova (first round)
 2015 Lost to Duke (second round)

In 1983, they won their first NCAA Tournament game, a "play-in" game against Georgia Southern, which earned them the right to play Purdue in the first round.

The men's team played in the National Invitation Tournament (NIT) in 2008, 2013, and 2014. They defeated defending national champion Kentucky in the first round of the 2013 NIT, a game that was played on the Robert Morris campus because Rupp Arena in Lexington, KY, was not available.

In recent years, both the men's and women's teams have had success in their conference. The women's team won the NEC Championship in 2008 and made an appearance in the 2008 NCAA Tournament, only to bow out in the first round to Rutgers. The women's team won the NEC Championship again in 2014, losing to Notre Dame in the first round of the 2014 NCAA Tournament.

The men's team won the 2009 NEC Championship, beating Mount St. Mary's 48–46. With the win, the school qualified for the 2009 NCAA Tournament, their sixth trip to the tournament. Their seventh trip came a year later, when the Colonials became the first team to beat Quinnipiac on the Bobcats' home court all season. The 52–50 win set up a date with Villanova in the 2010 NCAA Tournament. Behind 23 points from freshman guard Karon Abraham, No. 15 Robert Morris nearly pulled off an upset of the No. 2 Wildcats, leading much of the game before falling 73–70 in overtime.

The 2015 men's team followed their NEC Championship with the second NCAA Tournament game victory in school history, an 81–77 "play-in" game triumph over the University of North Florida. The victory earned the team a first round match-up with the eventual national champion, Duke Blue Devils.

The 2019-20 season was a special one for the Colonials, as they played their inaugural season at the UPMC Events Center. The first game in the new building marked the first time the RMU men would play host to their intra-county rivals, the Pitt Panthers. Although they would go on to lose that game, the men's team capped off the season with their record ninth—and final—NEC tournament title as they defeated Saint Francis University. That championship would have earned them an automatic bid to the 2020 NCAA Tournament, but it was unfortunately canceled due to the onset of the COVID-19 pandemic.

Ice hockey 

The men's ice hockey team competed in NCAA DI Atlantic Hockey, and the women's team competed in NCAA DI College Hockey America. RMU also fields a men's ACHA DI team that is a member of College Hockey Mid-America.

Since 2006, the ice hockey team has hosted the Three Rivers Classic (previously known as the Pittsburgh Collegiate Hockey Showcase until 2012), currently played at PPG Paints Arena (previously played at the now-demolished Mellon Arena.) The 2010 match-up featured No. 1 ranked Miami (Ohio). The 3–12–3 Colonials upset the RedHawks, 3–1. Two days later the Colonials won again at Miami. The Colonials' biggest previous win since the program was started in 2004 was against No. 2 Notre Dame in 2007.  Former professional hockey-player David Hanson (of Slap Shot fame) currently manages RMU's Island Sports Complex.

On May 26, 2021, Robert Morris University terminated both the men's and women's varsity hockey programs. On December 17, 2021, the school announced that, after successful fundraising efforts, the two teams would return for the 2023–24 season. RMU was soon reinstated to its former conference homes of Atlantic Hockey and CHA.

Other athletic teams 
The football and lacrosse teams play in Joe Walton Stadium, named in honor of former football team head coach Joe Walton, formerly the head coach of the NFL's New York Jets in the 1980s, and who started the program at Robert Morris in 1993. Walton led the team to the first Northeast Conference championship in 1996 and guided it to a perfect 10–0 season in 2000. Also, in 2010, Walton coached the Colonials football team to the NEC's inaugural bid to the FCS Playoffs with their league-high sixth regular-season championship. Walton retired after the 2013 program, handing the reigns over to top assistant John Banaszak, who won multiple Super Bowls as a defensive end with the Pittsburgh Steelers.

The school's soccer teams both play on the North Athletic Complex, and the hockey teams played their games at the RMU Island Sports Complex, just down the road from the campus on Neville Island.

On February 14, 2009, the men's lacrosse team defeated Penn State 12–11 in double overtime in the program's biggest victory at Joe Walton Stadium.

References

External links